St. Edward's School is a premier convent school located at Milsington Estate, Shimla, Himachal Pradesh, India. It is a boys-only day school. St. Edward's has been ranked among the top schools in India. It was initially affiliated to CISCE but was changed over to the Central Board of Secondary Education (CBSE) system in 2008. Today the School is managed by Simla Chandigarh Educational Society, under the Bishop of Simla Chandigarh Diocese.  The school offers education from Nursery to Class XII.

House Club System

All students are placed in one of the four houses named after the Four Evangelists: St. Mark's House, St. Luke's House, St. Matthew's House and St. John's House. Each house is led by a captain and a vice-captain, who are responsible for organizing and conducting various co-curricular activities in the school. They are usually chosen on the basis of their academic performance in addition to their participation in sports and cultural activities. Apart from the house captains, there are also a school captain and a vice-captain.

Various clubs form a central part of holistic learning in the school, namely the cultural club, science and maths club, literary club, sports club, eco club and yoga.

Controversy
The school landed itself in a controversy in 2012 by not allowing a Sikh student to wear a turban in school. The issue was settled after the intervention of the government.

Notable alumni

 Mohammad Hamid Ansari, 12th Vice President of India
 General Bipin Rawat, 1st Chief of Defence Staff & former Chief of Army Staff of the Indian Army
 Ajay Banga, President nominee, World Bank & ex-CEO, Mastercard
 Virbhadra Singh, former Chief Minister, Himachal Pradesh
 Kanwar Pal Singh Gill, ex-DGP, Punjab Police
 Reginald Massey, author
 Deepak Gupta, former Judge, Supreme Court of India
 Sanjay Karol, Judge, Supreme Court of India
 Sudhir Kakar, psychoanalyst and author
 Ashok Sukumaran, media artist
 Anil Wilson, former Vice-Chancellor, Himachal Pradesh University
 Vijay Kumar Berry, Maha Vir Chakra recipient
 Raj Mohan Vohra, Maha Vir Chakra recipient & Commander of the Eastern Command, Indian Army
 Antony Jameson, Professor of Engineering in the Department of Aeronautics & Astronautics, Stanford University, USA
 Pratap Bhanu Mehta, former Vice Chancellor, Ashoka University & former President, Centre for Policy Research 
 Ashok Chopra, journalist and author
 Anirudh Singh, Cabinet Minister, Government of Himachal Pradesh

References

External links

 
 

Educational institutions established in 1925
Christian schools in Himachal Pradesh
Education in Shimla
Schools in Colonial India
Catholic boarding schools in India
Boarding schools in Himachal Pradesh
1925 establishments in India
Schools in Shimla district
British-era buildings in Himachal Pradesh